Hector Carlier (1884 – 1 January 1946 in Kalmthout) was a Belgian banker and industrialist who was the son of banker Jean Baptist Ferdinand Carlier and Marie de Roy. He was married with Amelia Goossens and together they had three children. He is one of the founders of the Belgian oil company Petrofina. Petrofina merged with Total of France to form TotalFina and with Elf Aquitaine in 2000 to form TotalFinaElf. The company's current name is Total S.A.

Career
Hector Carlier started his career at the Banque d' Anvers of which his father was the owner, together with the Société Générale de Belgique. On 25 February 1920, he founded the oil company Compagnie Financière Belge des Pétroles, together with his brother Fernand and the Roman Catholic minister Aloys Van de Vyvere. The company got its oil from Romania, after they first had compensated the German claimants on that oil. Their success came to an abrupt end with the outbreak of World War II. The most important refinery of Petrofina in Dunkirk, was devastated during the war. After the war the Carliers were accused of economic collaboration. Hector committed suicide on 1 January 1946 on his Boterberg estate in Kalmthout, and his brother Fernand escaped to Brazil.

Personal life
In 1933 Hector had married the 23 years younger Dutch Amelia Goossens (died in 1989,) from Woensdrecht, in Dover, Great Britain. Together they had three children, Amalia (+2001), Ferdinand (1935-1986) and Marie-Antoinette (1934-2007) who all remained unmarried. The sisters Carlier, after the death of their mother, lived soberly at the Boterberg castle in Kalmthout. When Marie Antoinette died in 2007, she gave the entire family fortune to some private heirs and to the King Baudouin Foundation.

References

External links
 Wie was Hector Carlier? (Dutch)
 Legaat Petrofina naar Boudewijnstichting
 Petrofina, un lourd héritage
 Carlier

1884 births
1946 deaths
Belgian bankers
20th-century Belgian businesspeople
People from Kalmthout
TotalEnergies people
1946 suicides
Suicides in Belgium